Space Vampires vs Zombie Dinosaurs in 3D is the third studio album by American comedy metal band Psychostick, released on August 16, 2011, through Rock Ridge Music. It is the band's first studio album with bass player Matty J "Poolmoose" Rzemyk.

Background
The band announced during a webcast on November 4, 2010, that they are working on their new album to be released in summer 2011. The title of the new album, Space Vampires vs Zombie Dinosaurs in 3D, was announced on another webcast on March 10, 2011, and the band has said that it will have a "tentative August 2011 release date" through Rock Ridge Music. On July 12, 2011, the band announced the album's released date would be August 16, 2011. On July 22, 2011, the band began taking pre-orders for the album, doing so also allows for an instant download of the album's first single "Political Bum." On August 6, 2011, the band released "Because Boobs" as a free download in order to promote the album.

Track listing

Personnel
Psychostick
 Alex "Shmalex" Dontre – drums
 Robert "Rawrb" Kersey – lead vocals
 Joshua "The J" Key – guitars, vocals
 Matty J "Poolmoose" Rzemyk – bass, vocals
 Additional Musicians:
 Barry Donegan (of Look What I Did) as the political bum on "Political Bum"
 Produced by Joshua "The J" Key and Psychostick
 Mixed and Engineered by Joshua "The J" Key
 Artwork by Michelle "Souzou" Sladek
 Layout by Robert "Rawrb" Kersey
 Drums tracked by Adam Lichtenauer at Studio City

Chart performance

References

Psychostick albums
2011 albums
Rock Ridge Music albums